Cook's Regiment of Militia was called up at Wallingford, Connecticut on August 26, 1777, as reinforcements for the Continental Army during the Saratoga Campaign. The regiment marched quickly to join the gathering forces of Gen. Horatio Gates as he faced British General John Burgoyne in northern New York. The regiment served in General Poor's brigade. With the surrender of Burgoyne's Army on October 17 the regiment was disbanded on November 9, 1777.

Wallingford, Connecticut
Connecticut militia
Military units and formations established in 1777
Military in Connecticut